Zaixun (20 May 1885 – 1949), courtesy name Zhongquan, art name Chiyun, also known as Tsai Hsun in early references, was a Manchu noble of the late Qing dynasty. He also served as a Navy Minister in the Imperial Cabinet of Prince Qing. He was the sixth son of Prince Chun, a paternal half-uncle of the Xuantong Emperor, a half first cousin of the Tongzhi Emperor, and a paternal half-brother of the Guangxu Emperor.

Life
Zaixun was adopted into the lineage of his relative, Yizhi (奕誌; 1827–1850), because Yizhi had no son to succeed him. In 1887, he was made a buru bafen fuguo gong, and was subsequently promoted to feng'en fuguo gong in 1889 and feng'en zhenguo gong in 1890. In 1900, Zaixun's predecessor, Zaiyi, who succeeded Yizhi as "Prince Rui of the Second Rank" (later renamed to "Prince Duan of the Second Rank"), was stripped of his title of nobility and exiled to Xinjiang for his role in the Boxer Rebellion. Two years later, Zaixun succeeded Zaiyi as a beile of the Prince Rui peerage. In 1908, he was made an acting junwang (Prince of the Second Rank) but remained nominally a beile.

In 1909, Zaixun was appointed as an acting Navy Minister (海軍大臣) in the Imperial Cabinet headed by Prince Qing. Later, he was sent to Europe and the United States to study the navies of the Western powers. After returning to China, in 1911, he became a full Navy Minister. After the Xinhai Revolution overthrew the Qing dynasty, he lived the rest of his life in retirement in Beijing and Tianjin. He died in Tianjin in 1949.

Family 
 Wife, of the Biru clan
 Pugong (b. 19 March 1904), first son
 First daughter (b. 28 January 1905)
 Second daughter (b. 2 February 1906)
 Third daughter (b. 3 February 1907)
 Married Bai Fengming (1909–1980)

Ancestry

See also
 Prince Rui (瑞)
 Royal and noble ranks of the Qing dynasty#Male members

References

1885 births
1949 deaths
Qing dynasty imperial princes
Manchu politicians
Qing dynasty politicians from Beijing
Naval history of China
Prince Rui